Emma Kate Tonegato  (born 20 March 1995) is a professional Australian rugby footballer. She has represented Australia in rugby sevens and rugby league. Born in Wollongong, New South Wales and playing for The Tribe at rugby union club level, she debuted for Australia in November 2013. As of December 2015, she had 12 caps. She won a gold medal at the 2016 Summer Olympics in Rio.

Life
Emma's father is Italian Stefano Tonegato who emigrated to Australia from Valdagno, specifically from a frazione  named "San Quirico Valdagno". Emma started to play rugby when she was ten years old in a female junior team.

Career
Tonegato made her debut for the Australian Women's side in the opening leg of the 2013–14 IRB Sevens World Series in Dubai in November 2013. She has been a regular on the team since. She switched to rugby league and competed at the 2013 Women's Rugby League World Cup. She has the ability to play on the wing or in the centres.

Tonegato was named in the tournament Dream Team for the Amsterdam leg of the Rugby Sevens World Series in May 2015. Representative Honours include New South Wales, NSW Schoolgirls (2013) and the Youth Olympic Festival (2013).

Tonegato was a member of Australia's team at the 2016 Summer Olympics, defeating New Zealand in the final to win the inaugural sport Olympic gold medal.

At the 2017 Australia Day Honours she received the Medal of the Order of Australia for service to sport as a gold medalist at the Rio 2016 Summer Olympics.

Tonegato was named in the Australia squad for the Rugby sevens at the 2020 Summer Olympics. The team came second in the pool round but then lost to Fiji 14-12 in the quarterfinals. Full details.

In 2021, Tonegato signed with the St George Illawarra Dragons and played 7 games including the grand final where they lost 16-4. She also won the Daly M Medal for best and fairest. She resigned with the Dragons in 2022 where she played 6 games and in the Semi Final against the Knights.

References

External links
 Emma Tonegato at Australian Rugby
 
 
 

1995 births
Living people
Australia women's national rugby league team players
Australian female rugby league players
Australian female rugby sevens players
Australian female rugby union players
Australia international rugby sevens players
Australian people of Italian descent
Commonwealth Games medallists in rugby sevens
Commonwealth Games silver medallists for Australia
Medalists at the 2016 Summer Olympics
Olympic gold medalists for Australia
Olympic medalists in rugby sevens
Olympic rugby sevens players of Australia
Recipients of the Medal of the Order of Australia
Rugby league players from Wollongong
Rugby sevens players at the 2016 Summer Olympics
Rugby sevens players at the 2018 Commonwealth Games
Rugby sevens players at the 2020 Summer Olympics
Rugby union players from New South Wales
Medallists at the 2018 Commonwealth Games